Kåre Kolve (born 10 August 1964) is a Norwegian jazz musician (saxophone), and the older brother of the vibraphonist Ivar Kolve. He is known as bandleader of his own Kåre Kolve Quartet, several album releases and the collaborations within the bands "Lava", "Mezzoforte" and "Tre Små Kinesere".

Career 

After a year at Trøndertun Folkehøgskole, Kolve studied music on the Jazz program at Trondheim Musikkonsevatorium (1984–87), where he participated in "Trondheim Bop-service" and "First Set" releasing the album Going (1992). He is known from long time collaboration within the Norwegian jazz rock band "Lava", including four album releases, and the Icelandic jazz rock band "Mezzoforte" (1991–95), including the albums Fortissimos (1991) and Daybreak (1993). He is one of the driving forces of the band "Mambo Compañeros" together with Marit Hætta Øverli in Trondheim (1996–), including the album Viva Salsa (2003). Kolve has appeared on releases such as Innerst i sjelen (1994) with Sissel Kyrkjebø, Marit Hætta Øverli and Ole Edvard Antonsen, and he led his own Kåre Kolve Quartet with Espen Berg, including two releases.

At Vossajazz 2014, he appeared within the Polyostinat experience, by his brother Ivar Kolve. Together they performed within an elite team of Norwegian musicians, including Jørn Øien, Ellen Andrea Wang and last but not the least Jarle Vespestad. They delivered an indulgent poly rhythmic and poly harmonic treat for the discerning ear.

Honors 
2015: Commission Interactions for the Vossajazz and Trondheim Jazz Festival

Discography (in selection)

Solo albums 
As Kåre Kolve Quartet including Espen Berg (piano), Jo Fougner Skaansar (bass) and Magnus Forsberg (drums)
2009: My Direction (Curling Legs)
2010: Further Directions (Curling Legs)

Commission for Vossajazz including with Mathias Eick, Per Oddvar Johansen, Espen Berg, Ivar Kolve, and Anders Jormin
2017: Interactions (Curling Legs), live at the 2015 Vossajazz

Collaborative works 
With Terje Tysland
1988: Kainn Æ Få Lov (Plateselskapet)

Within "Lava»
1990: The Rhythm of Love (Mercury)
1996: The Very Best of Lava (Polydor), Compilation
2005: Alibi (Tylden & Co)
2009: Symphonic Journey (Tylden & Co)

Within "First Set»
1992: Going

Within "Mezzoforte»
1991: Fortissimos (RCA), Compilation
1991: Better Love (RCA)
1994: After Hours  (ZYX Music)
1994: Daybreak (CNR Music)

With Frank and Rita Eriksen
1994: The Water Is Wide (BMG, Norway)

Within "Tre Små Kinesere»
1996: Tro Håp & Kjærlighet (Columbia)
1998: Storeslem (Columbia)

Within "Postgirobygget»
1996: Essensuell (Norske Gram)

Within "Trondheim Storband»
2002: Urban Lazy (Not on Label)

Within "Mambo Compañeros»
2003: Viva Salsa

With Espen Lind
2008: Army of One (BMG, Norway)

With Annjo K. Greenall
2012: Eg Vandrar Langs Kaiane (Øra Fonogram)

References

External links 

20th-century Norwegian saxophonists
21st-century Norwegian saxophonists
Norwegian jazz saxophonists
Norwegian jazz composers
Norwegian University of Science and Technology alumni
Musicians from Voss
Musicians from Bergen
1964 births
Living people
20th-century saxophonists
Mezzoforte (band) members